Otosirieze Obi-Young  (born 1994) is a Nigerian writer, editor, culture journalist and curator. He is editor-in-chief of Open Country Mag, an African literary magazine. He was editor of Folio Nigeria, a CNN affiliate that covers Nigerian art, business, and entertainment. He was deputy editor of online literary magazine Brittle Paper. In 2019, he won the inaugural The Future Awards Africa Prize for Literature. He has been described as among the "top curators and editors from Africa" and listed among "the 100 most influential young Nigerians."

Career 
Otosirieze Obi-Young was born in Aba, Nigeria. He studied at the University of Nigeria, Nsukka. He taught at Godfrey Okoye University, Enugu. 

He has served on the judging panel of the Gerald Kraak Prize, an initiative for writing and visual art about on gender, social justice and sexuality. He was a judge for the Miles Morland Foundation Writing Scholarship. He is an editor at 14, Nigeria's first queer art collective. He is the founder of the Art Naija Series anthologies, which include Enter Naija: The Book of Places and Work Naija: The Book of Vocations.

Views on LGBTQ Literature 
Obi-Young has written about LGBTQ writing in Africa. In a 2017 letter entitled "Queer Literature in Africa Is Not a Trend", he wrote: "To write literature humanizing queerness is a political act: because writing itself is political, because to humanize queerness is a decision in much the same way that to demonize it is, but a decision to be honest and empathetic and truthful, because to tell the truth is a decision," he wrote. "But I must point out also that to write literature humanizing queerness is only as political as it is not, because it is grounded in lived experience. How can one un-robbed of empathy say that to show these lives in literature is a 'political concession'?" 

He has commented on the category of LGBT literature," writing that he is "skeptical of the term 'queer literature,' or 'LGBTQ literature,' because it has no counter-reference. Unlike 'African literatures'—Anglophone, Francophone, Lusophone, and in indigenous languages—which fits into a geopolitics that acknowledges an equal term, 'European literatures'—English, French, Italian, Spanish—the lack of an equal for 'queer literature'—an equal which would have been called 'heterosexual literature,' writing that examines what it means to be heterosexual—begs the question: Why should literature exploring same-sex desire be categorized based on who its characters find themselves loving or on who its writers themselves love, especially as such categorization is withheld from literature exploring desire for the opposite sex? While the categorization does function as a marketing tool, a way of drawing attention to literature traditionally overlooked, lives deliberately unseen, it is one that is rooted in Othering, and so proves insufficient in humanizing queerness, particularly with the way it takes focus away from the skill of its writers and pushes it to their subject, a denial not bestowed on writers of 'heterosexual literature.

Views on contemporary African literature 
In 2018, Obi-Young used the term "the confessional generation" to describe his generation of African writers.."

In a 2016 interview with Africa in Dialogue, Obi-Young is quoted as saying: "Cultural production in Africa is no longer dominated by heterosexual men, not as it used to be. Literature, for example, is now run by women, and they are using it so well to fight back, to write their sex and gender back into history. The next generation of writers, the ones who began to blossom last year and would peak in five years’ time, is dominated by people who are either queer or female and who have already begun to revolt against the normalized absence of their kind in literature."

Fiction 
Writing in Los Angeles Review of Books about Obi-Young's short story "A Tenderer Blessing", Erik Gleibermann notes: 

“Chukwudi's language circles around his feelings as he observes Nnaemeka on campus. The two enter an intimate friendship. Yet much still remains unspoken. Obi-Young relies on body language cues and the spaces between words to shape the intimacy. Finally, Chukwudi internally names his own feelings, though even then with a heterosexual framing. 'For an unguarded moment, a slender second of resurgent craving, I wondered if he'd ever imagine that were he a girl, I would chase him endlessly.' As readers, we feel almost as though we've been holding our breath the whole story, waiting for him to finally say it. We feel almost as though we have ourselves come out. This makes Chukwudi's subsequent unrequited confession all the more devastating."

Works

Short stories

Culture writing 
 "Chimamanda Ngozi Adichie Is in a Different Place Now", Open Country Magazine, 2021 
  "How Teju Cole Opened a New Path in African Literature", Open Country Magazine, 2021
 "Cameroon's New Literary Generation Comes of Age, as Anglophone Crisis Deepens", Open Country Magazine, 2021
 "With Novels and Images, Maaza Mengiste Is Reframing Ethiopian History", Open Country Magazine, 2021
 "The Making of Ndebe, an Indigenous Script for the Igbo Language", Folio Nigeria, 2020
 "In the Age of Afrobeats, a New Sound for Highlife", Folio Nigeria, 2020
 "In Nigeria, Investigative Journalism Finds Culture Impact", Folio Nigeria, 2020

Awards 
 2019: The Future Awards Africa Prize for Literature.
 2020: The 100 Most Influential Young Nigerians, by Avance Media.

References

External links 
 

1994 births
21st-century Nigerian writers
Igbo people
Living people
Nigerian journalists
People from Abia State
University of Nigeria alumni